Tuwaym is a Syrian village located in the Hama Subdistrict of Hama District. According to the Syria Central Bureau of Statistics (CBS), Tuwaym had a population of 1,428 in the 2004 census. Its inhabitants are predominantly Sunni Muslims.

References

Bibliography

 

Populated places in Hama District